Akhtachi (also Romanized as Akhtāchī; also known as Akhtaji, Akhtarchi, and Akhtehchī) is a village in Abrumand Rural District, in the Central District of Bahar County, Hamadan Province, Iran. At the 2006 census, its population was 592, in 125 families.

References 

Populated places in Bahar County